The Eminent Lives series is HarperCollins' series of "brief biographies by distinguished authors on canonical figures."  The general editor of the series was James Atlas.

The series includes books by: 

 Robert Gottlieb on George Balanchine
 Paul Johnson on George Washington
 Christopher Hitchens on Thomas Jefferson 
 Michael Korda on Ulysses S. Grant
 Francine Prose on Caravaggio 
 Edmund Morris on Ludwig van Beethoven 
 Joseph Epstein on Alexis de Tocqueville 
 Peter Kramer on Sigmund Freud 
 Karen Armstrong on Muhammad 
 Bill Bryson on William Shakespeare
 Matt Ridley on Francis Crick
 Ross King on Niccolò Machiavelli.

References

External links
Harper Collins

Multi-volume biographies
American biographies
HarperCollins books